Camp Verde Unified School District (CVUSD) is a school district with headquarters in Camp Verde, Arizona, United States.

Schools
 Camp Verde High School
 Camp Verde Middle School
 Camp Verde Elementary School
 Camp Verde Online

References

External links

 

 
School districts in Arizona
School districts in Yavapai County, Arizona
School districts established in 1894
1894 establishments in Arizona Territory